Isom is an unincorporated community in Logan County, West Virginia.

References 

Unincorporated communities in West Virginia
Unincorporated communities in Logan County, West Virginia